Kmart Corporation (doing business as Kmart and stylized as kmart) is an American retail company that owns a chain of big box department stores. The company is headquartered in Hoffman Estates, Illinois, United States.
The company was incorporated in 1899 as S. S. Kresge Corporation and renamed Kmart Corporation in 1977. The first store with the Kmart name opened in 1962 in Garden City, Michigan. At its peak in 1994, Kmart operated 2,486 stores globally, including 2,323 discount stores and Super Kmart Center locations in the United States. As of April 16, 2022, that number was down to nine, including just three in the continental United States. From 2005 through 2019, Kmart was a subsidiary of Sears Holdings Corporation. Since 2019, Kmart has been a subsidiary of Transform SR Brands LLC, a privately held company that was formed in 2019 to acquire assets from Sears Holdings.

History

Early years 

S. S. Kresge, the founder of the company that would become Kmart, met variety-store pioneer Frank Winfield Woolworth while working as a traveling salesman and selling to all 19 of Woolworth's stores at the time. In 1897, Kresge invested $6,700 saved from his job into a five-and-dime store in Memphis, Tennessee. He jointly owned the first store with his former tinware customer, John McCrory. Kresge and McCrory added a second store in downtown Detroit the following year. These were the first S.S. Kresge stores. After two years of partnership, he traded McCrory his share in the Memphis store, plus $3,000, for full ownership of the Detroit store, and formed the Kresge & Wilson Company with his brother-in-law, Charles J. Wilson.

In 1912, Kresge incorporated the S.S. Kresge Company in Delaware with 85 stores. In 1916, Kresge incorporated a new S.S. Kresge Company in Michigan and took over the operations of the original company; the new company in Michigan is the modern day Kmart company. The company was first listed on the New York Stock Exchange on May 23, 1918. During World War I, Kresge experimented with raising the limit on prices in his stores to $1. By 1924, Kresge was worth approximately $375 million and owned real estate of the approximate value of $100 million. Growth early in the 20th century remained brisk, with 257 stores in 1924, rising to 597 stores by 1929. Kresge retired as president in 1925. The Great Depression reduced profitability and resulted in store closings, with the number rising to 682 in 1940. After the war, shopping patterns changed and many customers moved out of the cities into the suburbs.

1960s–1970s 

Cunningham and Sam Walton were both inspired by Ann & Hope, which they each visited in 1961. Sixteen more Kmart stores opened in 1962. Kmart Foods, a now-defunct chain of Kmart supermarkets, opened in that decade. Though the store chain continued to open Kmart branded stores, the store chain was still officially called S.S. Kresge Company.

Company founder Kresge died on October 18, 1966, at age 99.

Around the time of the opening of the first Kmart, some poorly performing S.S. Kresge stores were converted to a new "Jupiter Discount Stores" brand, which was conceived as a bare-bones, deep discount outfit. During the 1970s, Kmart put a number of competing retailers out of business. Kresge, Jupiter and Kmart stores mainly competed with other store chains like Zayre, Ames, Bradlees, Caldor, Hills, and those that were operated by MMG-McCrory Stores (McCrory, McLellan, H.L. Green, J.J. Newberry, S.H. Kress, TG&Y, Silver's and eventually G.C. Murphy Co.). In 1977, S.S. Kresge Company changed its name to K Mart Corporation.

1980s 
In 1980, Vice Chairman Bernard M. Fauber was elected as the chairman and as the CEO of Kmart.

In 1981, the 2,000th Kmart store opened. By the end of 1981, there were 2,055 Kmart stores across the United States and Canada.

In 1987, the Kmart Corporation sold its remaining 76 Kresge and Jupiter stores in the United States to McCrory Stores, and the brands were almost entirely discontinued, although Canadian Kresge and Jupiter stores continued to operate until 1994.

Kmart experimented with co-branding in 1985, when the in-store cafeteria at the store in Canton, Michigan, was converted to a Wendy's.

Until November 1990, when it was passed by Walmart, Kmart was the second-largest retailer in the United States, after Sears. During the 1980s, the company's fortunes began to change; many of Kmart's stores were considered to be outdated and in decaying condition. In the late 1980s and into the 1990s, the corporate office shifted much of its focus from the Kmart stores to other companies it had acquired or created, such as Sports Authority, Builders Square, and Waldenbooks.

Blue Light Special 
The Blue Light Special was a sale promotion within the store for a short period within store hours only. It was advertised using a rotating blue light, in the same style a police car used, and was announced over the store public address system with the phrase "attention Kmart shoppers", a phrase which became a pop culture reference. The original Blue Light Special limited-time offers to sell slower moving merchandise  was first introduced in 1965, was retired in 1991. The company brought back the Blue Light Special in 2001, but again discontinued it in 2002. The concept was briefly revived in 2005, though Kmart at that time had no plans to use the concept long-term. Blue Light Specials were revived again in 2009 on Saturdays, offering surprise hour-long sales on selected merchandise, but were discontinued again. Blue Light Specials were revived once again in November 2015.

1990–2001: New image 

In 1990, in an effort to update its image, Kmart introduced a new logo. It dropped the old-style italic "K" with a turquoise "mart" in favor of a red block letter K with the word "mart" written in script and contained inside the "K". Kmart then began remodeling stores shortly thereafter. This logo was replaced in 2004 with the current logo. In 1990, Little Caesars Pizza opened its first in-store Kmart restaurant in Rochester, Michigan (coincidentally, both Little Caesars and Kmart were founded in Garden City, Michigan, in 1959 and 1962 respectively). In 1995, Kmart also tried to reinvent itself by using the short-lived name Today's Kmart.

In 1991, the company revised its name slightly to Kmart Corporation.

In 1992, Kmart entered the Eastern European market with the purchase of 13 stores in the former Czechoslovakia. These stores were sold off in 1996.

The company also began to offer exclusive merchandise by Martha Stewart, Kathy Ireland, Jaclyn Smith, Lauren Hutton, and Thalía. Other recognizable brands included exclusively licensed merchandising of products relating to Sesame Street and Disney. Actress and television personality Rosie O'Donnell and actress/director and producer Penny Marshall became among the company's most recognized spokespersons.

Super Kmart Center (Super Kmart) opened an all-new location on July 25, 1991, in Medina Township, Ohio, featuring a full-service grocery with a full-service deli, seafood counter and bakery. It also had general merchandise like many Kmarts had. After the Medina and Copley store opened, many more super Kmarts were open nationwide. However, this location was downsized in 2011 and was one of a number of Kmarts closed in early 2012 due to dismal Christmas 2011 sales. The second ground-up Super Kmart Center opened in Copley Township, Ohio, featuring an in-store video rental center, and an in-store carryout Chinese restaurant. This location has also shut down. The last Super Kmart Center in Howland Township, Ohio, closed on April 8, 2018. The largest super Kmart store was in Euclid, Ohio as it was a former Hypermart.
Big Kmart opened in Chicago, Illinois, on April 23, 1997. The format focuses on home fashions, children's apparel, and consumables (The Pantry). Most Kmart stores were remodeled to this format during the late 1990s and the early 2000s. During 1997 and 1998, Kmart converted 1,245 of their regular Kmart stores into Big Kmart stores. Initially, the Big Kmart stores were successful, and by the end of 1997, Kmart had seen their sales numbers grow by 10% due to success of their Big Kmart stores. In 1998, Kmart acquired 45 former Venture stores and converted them into Big Kmart stores. By the end of 1998, 62% of Kmart's stores were Big Kmart stores. Kmart later converted nearly 1,900 of their regular Kmart stores into Big Kmart stores in 1999. By the end of 1999, Kmart saw another increase in sales numbers by 6.5% due to the success of their Big Kmart stores. The last Big Kmart in Marshall, Michigan, closed on November 22, 2021.

The Sports Authority was acquired by Kmart in 1990 and spun-off 5 years later.

Kmart's profitability and sales peaked in 1992, and have since declined due to competition with Walmart, Target, and internet shopping. In 1994, Kmart announced they would close 110 stores. Unlike its competitors Walmart and Target, Kmart failed to invest in computer technology to manage its supply chain. Furthermore, Kmart maintained a high dividend, which reduced the amount of money that was available for improving its stores. Many business analysts also faulted the company for failing to create a coherent brand image.

In September 1995, Kmart sold its money-losing in-store auto repair centers to Penske Corporation for $112 million to operate them as Penske Auto Centers. Penske later closed the auto repair centers in 2002 as a result of a payment dispute with Kmart.

In 1997, Kmart launched the Kmart Cash Card as a replacement for the paper gift certificates and to facilitate the return process.
In July 1999, Kmart hired SuperValu and Fleming to distribute $3.9 billion worth of food and other related products to all Kmart stores.

From 1999 to 2000 Kmart converted 150 regular Kmart stores into Big Kmart stores during the first half of 2000.

In 2000, Kmart and Capital One launched an all-new co-branded MasterCard as a replacement for the private label Kmart credit cards.

Also in 2000, Kmart expanded the Martha Stewart Everyday Garden Collection to include live plants and seeds. Kmart also launched the Martha Stewart Everyday Kitchen, which is a complete line of housewares essentials.

In July 2000, Kmart closed 72 underperforming stores due to poor sales, while opening 20 new Big Kmart stores, converting 12 regular Kmart stores into Super Kmart Center stores, and opening 5 new Super Kmart Center stores. and the company announced a planned major restructuring, in which Kmart would invest in new customer check-out and new inventory management technology and other related systems as well.

In 2001, Kmart opened several new Super Kmart stores as part of Kmart's plan to expand their Super Kmart Center store portfolio, along with Kmart trying to make groceries available at stores as well. However, due to Kmart filing for bankruptcy in January 2002, Kmart was unable to open any more new Super Kmart Center stores, and any of the Super Kmart Center stores that were under construction during Kmart's 2002 bankruptcy were halted, no matter how close the stores were to completion.

In 2001, Kmart signed a $4.5 billion arrangement with Fleming, making them the sole food and consumables distributor for the company's stores.

In February 2001, Japanese video game company Sega sued Kmart for failure to pay $2.2 million of $25.9 million for Sega Dreamcast game systems.

In August 2001, Target sued Kmart because the company's "Dare to Compare" advertising campaign inaccurately compared its own prices with those of Target a majority of the time on in-store signs.

2002–2009: Collapse and merger with Sears 

On January 22, 2002, Kmart filed for Chapter 11 bankruptcy protection under the leadership of its then-chairman Charles Conaway and president Mark Schwartz. Conaway, who successfully expanded CVS Corporation, accepted an offer to take the helm at Kmart along with a loan of $5 million (equivalent to $ in ). In a scandal similar to that involving Enron, Conaway and Schwartz were accused of misleading shareholders and other company officials about the company's financial crisis while making millions and allegedly spending the company's money on airplanes, houses, boats and other luxuries. At a conference for Kmart employees on January 22, Conaway accepted "full blame" for the financial disaster. As Kmart emerged from bankruptcy, Conaway was forced to step down, and was asked to pay back all the loans he had taken.

After dismissing Conaway and Schwartz, Kmart closed more than 300 stores in the U.S., including all the Kmart stores in Alaska, and laid off around 34,000 workers as part of the restructuring process. Kmart introduced five prototype stores with a new logo, layout, and lime green and gray color scheme, one in White Lake, Michigan, and four in central Illinois: (Peoria, Pekin, Morton and Washington). The new layout was touted as having wider aisles and improved selection and lighting, and the city or town's name was featured under the new Kmart logo at the front entrance. However, Kmart could not afford a full-scale rollout. The lime green prototype was abandoned for the new Kmart "Orange" concept that rolled out at several of its locations throughout the United States in 2006.

While Kmart was going through bankruptcy, a significant amount of Kmart's outstanding debt was purchased by ESL Investments, a hedge fund controlled by Edward Lampert. Lampert worked to accelerate the bankruptcy process.

On January 13, 2003, Kmart closed 326 stores due to a lack of profitability and poor sales.

On May 6, 2003, Kmart emerged from bankruptcy protection as a subsidiary of the new Kmart Holding Corporation. On June 10, 2003, Kmart began trading on the NASDAQ stock market with the ticker symbol of KMRT with Lampert serving as the chairman and with ESL Investments controlling 53% of the new company for an investment of less than $1 billion. Lampert dismissed his concerns that the smaller company would be at a disadvantage, stating "The focus that a lot of people have in retail revolves around sales, but sales without profit do not allow a business to be successful in the long term." He began to improve the company's balance sheet by reducing inventory, cutting costs, and closing underperforming stores. By the fourth quarter of 2003, Kmart posted its first profitable quarter in three years, although it has since returned to an operating loss.

On July 23, 2004, a new Kmart logo featuring a large red "K" with "kmart" in small block letters underneath it was announced. On August 12, 2004, Kmart and E! Entertainment Television announced a new, exclusive, cross-promotional clothing brand called Attention. Attention was launched as a new clothing brand that would be sold only at Kmart stores and would be used to promote E! News Live. Kmart had previously signed a similar deal with the WB Network to have the cast of five WB shows wear Kmart branded clothing during shows.

On November 8, 2004, Kmart launched the Kmart Rewards credit card that is managed by HSBC Bank.

On November 17, 2004, Kmart's management announced its intention to purchase Sears for $11 billion. As part of the merger, the Kmart Holding Corporation (the company that owns Kmart) would be transferred to the new Sears Holdings Corporation and Sears would be purchased by the new Sears Holdings Corporation. The new corporation announced that it would continue to operate stores under both the Sears and Kmart brands. Around this time, Kmart changed its logo from a red K with the script "mart" inside, to the same K with the chain's name in lowercase letters below it. Kmart's headquarters were relocated to Hoffman Estates, Illinois, and in 2012 the sprawling headquarters complex in Troy, Michigan, was acquired by the Forbes Company, which owns the nearby upscale mall, Somerset Collection. No concrete plans for redevelopment of the site had been announced.
In 2005, Sears Holdings Corporation introduced the Sears Essentials store format, which would serve as a Kmart-Sears hybrid. Sears Essentials stores were freestanding (not located at a shopping mall) stores. In 2006, the company discontinued the Sears Essentials name, and renamed all of the Sears Essentials stores as Sears Grand stores.

Kmart started remodeling stores to the "Orange" prototype in 2005. In 2006, the typical white and blue interior of the stores was changed to orange and brown, and shelf heights were lowered to create better sightlines. The remodeled stores contain an appliance department with Kenmore Appliances and most have hardware departments that sell Craftsman tools, which prior to the merger had been exclusive to Sears stores. Some auto centers left vacant by Penske after Kmart filed for bankruptcy had been converted to Sears Auto Centers. As of 2009, 280 stores had been remodeled to this new prototype.

In July 2009, Sears Holdings opened its first Sears-branded appliance store inside a Kmart. The  store-within-a-store opened inside the former garden department of a Birmingham, Alabama, Kmart. It was two-thirds the size of the appliance department in most Sears stores, but larger than the  appliance department in remodeled Kmart stores.

In October 2009, it was reported that Kmart and Martha Stewart Living Omnimedia failed to come to a new agreement. This came after Stewart made remarks on CNBC that her line at Kmart had deteriorated, particularly after the Sears merger.

In November 2009, Kmart reported its first year-over-year sales increase of 0.5% since 2005, and only the second such increase since 2001.

2010–2018: Decline 
On December 27, 2011, after a disastrous holiday sales season, Sears Holdings announced that 100 to 120 of Sears and Kmart stores would close.

In 2014, news reports indicated that Kmart was liquidating dozens of stores across the United States. Kmart's parent company, Sears Holdings Corporation, underwent financial distress throughout the year, sparking an unspecified number of closings of Sears and Kmart locations amid vendors' and lenders' concerns about its liquidity. Along with store closings, measures included the spinning off its Lands' End division, selling most of its stake in Sears Canada, issuing debt and taking on loans that cumulatively put it on track to raise $1.445 billion in cash in 2014. Howard Riefs, a company spokesman who has often spoken on behalf of Kmart, said, "Store closures are part of a series of actions we're taking to reduce on-going expenses, adjust our asset base and accelerate the transformation of our business model."

On October 10, 2014, Kmart was a victim of a data breach concerning customers' credit and debit card information. On October 19, Kmart stated, "Based on the forensic investigation to date, no personal information, no debit card PIN numbers, no email addresses and no social security numbers were obtained by those criminally responsible. There is also no evidence that kmart.com customers were impacted. This data breach has been contained and the malware has been removed. I sincerely apologize for any inconvenience this may cause our members and customers."

In January 2015, Kmart agreed to pay $102,048 and other consideration to settle a U.S. Equal Employment Opportunity Commission disability discrimination lawsuit. According to the lawsuit, Kmart offered a job at its Hyattsville, Maryland, store to a candidate with kidney disease on dialysis. The candidate advised the hiring manager that he could not provide a urine sample for the company's mandatory pre-employment drug screening because of his medical condition, and requested a reasonable accommodation such as a blood test or other drug test that did not require a urine sample; Kmart had refused to provide an alternative test and denied the candidate employment.

In April 2016, Kmart announced that it was liquidating 68 stores. The chain announced in September 2016 that 64 more stores in 28 states would close by mid-December 2016. Sears Holdings CEO Eddie Lampert stated in October 2016 that there were not and never had been plans to close the Kmart format and that they are working hard to make it a "more fun, engaging place to shop, powered by our integrated retail innovations and Shop Your Way". In December 2016, at least 25 Kmart locations were targeted for closure in early 2017.

In January 2017, Kmart announced that 78 more stores would close, including the first Kmart location in Garden City, Michigan. Financial analysts began warning that the fate of Sears Holdings was nearing its end. In May 2017, Kmart announced the upcoming closure of 18 more stores. Sears Holdings admitted uncertainty regarding the survival of both Sears and Kmart. In early June 2017, Kmart announced that an additional 49 stores across the U.S. were to be shuttered by September 2017. In early July 2017, Kmart had announced that 35 more stores would close by early October 2017. In late August 2017, Kmart announced another 28 store closures, including the last Rhode Island location, in Cranston. On October 11, 2017, with no closing sale held, the Kmart store in Santa Rosa, California, was apparently burnt down by wildfires in the Bay Area, adding to the list of closed stores. On October 17, 2017, Kmart announced the liquidation of an unspecified number of locations by late November. On November 3, 2017, it was announced that a further 45 Kmarts (along with 18 Sears stores) were to close, effective by January 2018, including Kmart's last store in Alabama, in Albertville.

According to Fortune.com, Kmart and Sears did not run any television advertisements during the 2017 holiday season in order to focus on digital marketing after evaluating the effectiveness of its various marketing efforts.

On January 4, 2018, after yet another disappointing holiday sales season, Kmart announced the liquidation of 64 more stores in the spring of 2018. This included Kmart's only remaining Super Kmart location in Warren, Ohio, which officially discontinued the Super Kmart format. According to MSN Money, Kmart along with sister company Sears had an extremely high chance of disappearing and going defunct in 2018, such that 2017 would have marked its final holiday season as an independent brand.

On March 15, 2018, Sears Holdings announced that a small profit was made in the fourth quarter of 2017. However, investors claimed that it was due to tax refunds and that sales were still falling for both Kmart and Sears. On March 26, 2018, CEO Eddie Lampert said, "I'm not sure Kmart on its own could ever be a great retailer," implying that the company was trying to shift to online shopping as opposed to brick and mortar stores. On April 12, 2018, Sears announced plans to close and auction 16 of its Sears stores, and close several more Kmart locations, but did not specify how many. Two known locations on the list were Kmart stores in Brandon, Florida, and Saugus, Massachusetts. In early May, Sears announced the liquidation of several more Kmarts, including the last Kmart in Vermont, in Bennington.

On May 21, 2018, Sears Holdings announced yet another round of liquidation sales in forty Sears and Kmart stores across 24 states. These stores were closed by July 4, 2018. On May 31, Sears Holdings announced the liquidation of an additional 16 Kmart stores and 48 Sears stores, including the last Kmart in Hawaii, in Līhue. The closings announced May 31, 2018, were from among 100 unprofitable stores in Sears Holdings and the remaining 28 unprofitable stores were, "a small group of stores that was pulled from the closing list ... as they are being evaluated further," meaning even more store closings could occur later in the year. Sears Holdings did not disclose those locations at the time. On June 28, 2018, Sears Holdings disclosed 10 of the stores being evaluated and announced they would close by September 2018. Liquidation sales began on the same day. On July 13, 2018, news came through from multiple sources that even more Kmart stores were set to liquidate across the nation. On August 23, 2018, it was announced that 13 more stores would close by November.

2018–2019: Second bankruptcy 
On October 15, 2018, Sears Holdings filed Chapter 11 bankruptcy and announced that it would close 142 stores, including 63 Kmart stores, which included the last Kmart in Arkansas, in Russellville, the last two Kmarts in Georgia, in Covington and Peachtree City, and the last two Kmarts in Kansas, in Kansas City and Salina. Sears Holdings' bankruptcy also marked Kmart's second bankruptcy in 16 years. On November 8, 2018, Sears Holdings announced it would close an additional 40 stores, including 11 Kmart stores. On November 23, 2018, Sears Holdings released a list of 505 stores, including 239 Kmart stores, to be presented for sale in the bankruptcy process while all other stores were holding liquidation sales. However, the stores for sale were not guaranteed to be protected from liquidation in the future. On December 28, 2018, Sears Holdings announced it would close 80 additional stores, consisting of 37 Kmart stores.

In a proposal announced in early January, Sears Holdings planned only to keep 202 Kmart stores along with 223 Sears stores open, assuming that it would survive the bankruptcy process. Most of the proposed locations were in highly populated coastal regions.

On January 15, 2019, when it had appeared that Kmart's parent, Sears Holdings, was preparing to file for Chapter 7 liquidation, the bankruptcy court judge ordered the company to return to the negotiating table and work out a new deal with Eddie Lampert to prevent the liquidation from occurring. A new deal was struck at the last minute that would keep up to 400 Sears and Kmart stores operating. On January 19, 2019, Sears Holdings officially announced that they had won the auction, and that some of the then existing stores were to remain open.

On January 24, 2019, a group of unsecured creditors, which included Simon Property Group, filed a motion with the bankruptcy court to overturn the deal Sears Holdings had recently made with Lampert, claiming Lampert had been "engaged in serial asset stripping" of the company at the expense of suppliers and landlords. The creditors had requested that the bankruptcy court rule to liquidate the company instead of allowing reorganization so that the creditors would be able to recover more money that was still owed to them. On January 28, the federal government-operated Pension Benefit Guaranty Corporation announced that they were not in favor of Sears Holdings' current agreement with Lampert since that agreement would create a $1.7 billion funding gap in the employee pension fund, requiring American taxpayers to cover the shortfall. In papers filed on February 1 with the bankruptcy court, ESL "outlined plans to close three Kmart stores per month in 2019" if the court would decide to accept ESL's purchase bid.

In February 2019, it was announced that a U.S. bankruptcy judge approved the sale of the most lucrative part of Sears Holdings to Edward Lampert, allowing the surviving part of the company that operated both Sears and Kmart to remain in business at the expense of suppliers, landlords, employees, pensioners, the U.S. government, and other creditors. Kmart would have 202 locations after the sale was to be completed.

2019–present: New management and further decline 
The sale of 202 Kmart stores to Transform Holdco was finalized in February 2019, with the remaining Kmart locations liquidated to partially pay off Sears Holdings creditors.

In May 2019, it was revealed that Kmart would close its store in Walla Walla, Washington in July, making it the first post-bankruptcy closure for the brand since being bought by ESL. On August 6, 2019, TransformCo announced plans to close five additional stores by October 2019. At the time of the announcement, TransformCo also added that it "cannot rule out additional store closures in the near term". Between August 5 and 23, 2019, it was later announced that four more Kmarts would close.

In late 2019, the massive closure of 120 Kmart stores was announced.

In November 2019, Kmart announced the closing of 45 stores in February 2020. The Wall Street Journal reported that Transformco "would continue to evaluate its retail footprint, suggesting that additional closures are possible". On February 6, 2020, Kmart announced it would close 15 more stores.

As of February 2023, only 3 locations remained in the US: in Miami, Florida, Westwood, New Jersey, and Bridgehampton, New York.

Headquarters 

The owner of Kmart, Transform Holdco LLC, had its headquarters in Hoffman Estates, Illinois, just outside of Chicago since 1993 when it moved out of the Sears Tower in downtown Chicago. Kmart's headquarters had been in Hoffman Estates since Kmart bought Sears in 2005, but in December 2021, Transformco announced that it intended to put its corporate headquarters and 120 surrounding acres in the Northwest suburb on the market at the start of the new year.

The headquarters were formerly located in the Kmart International Headquarters at 3100 W. Big Beaver Road in Troy, Michigan, in Metro Detroit. The facility had 23 interconnected modules. Each had three stories, except for one module, which was one story. Based on the layout, Norm Sinclair of DBusiness concluded that it was "a study in inefficiency".

Subsidiaries

Current 

 Kmart is a chain of discount department stores that are usually free-standing or located in strip malls. They carry compact discs (CDs), DVDs, TV shows on DVD, electronics, bedding, household hardware, sporting goods, clothing, toys, jewelry, office supplies, health and beauty products, over-the-counter medications, home decor, and a limited selection of food items. Many also have a garden center, a Jackson Hewitt tax center, a pharmacy, and a K-Cafe or a deli serving Nathan's Hot Dogs and pizza. Most of them were either converted to or rebranded as Big Kmart while some were converted into Super Kmart stores.

Former 

 American Fare was a chain of hypermarkets that operated from 1989 to 1994. It was a joint venture involving Kmart, which owned 51 percent of the store, and Birmingham, Alabama-based Bruno's Supermarkets, which owned 49 percent of the stores. The first store opened in Stone Mountain, Georgia, near Atlanta, on January 29, 1989. An area in the front of the store housed a music and video store, a food court, bank, hair salon, pharmacy and a card store. A third and final store opened in Jackson, Mississippi in August 1990, with plans for a fourth store in Birmingham, Alabama never coming to fruition. In June 1992, Bruno's announced the termination of its partnership with the Kmart Corporation, and that Kmart would assume ownership of the three stores. The three stores closed by May 1994. The Stone Mountain store now houses the DeKalb County Board of Education. The Charlotte store was converted to Super Kmart, then a Steve & Barry's, before closing in 2009. It now houses a Verizon call center, and the Jackson store's parking lot became a Carmax in 2007, while the building itself is now owned by Comcast. The American Fare brand is used on some Kmart store-brand consumable products.
 Big Kmart was a chain of discount department stores that carried everything a regular Kmart carries, but emphasizes home decor, children's clothing, and more food items such as meat and poultry, baked goods, frozen foods and an extended, but limited section of garden produce. Big Kmart stores also featured a garden center, a pharmacy, a branch of a local bank, a Jackson Hewitt tax center, an Olan Mills portrait studio, an arcade, a K-Café or Little Caesars Pizza Station, and sometimes a Kmart Express gas station. As noted above, Kmart introduced the Big Kmart brand company-wide when it was introduced in 1997. Some Big Kmart locations were either closed or converted to normal Kmart stores. The final Big Kmart store in Marshall, Michigan closed permanently on November 21, 2021.
 . In 1999 Kmart began offering a dial-up Internet service called BlueLight, which was eventually spun off as an independent company. BlueLight was initially free and supported by banner ads. BlueLight dropped the free service in February 2001 and was reacquired by Kmart in July 2001. In 2002 United Online, which also owns NetZero and Juno, bought the BlueLight service after Kmart filed for bankruptcy. In August 2006, Bluelight dropped the banners. In August 2006, the service cost $14.95 a month and had around 165,000 subscribers.
 Borders Books was a chain of bookstores acquired by Kmart in 1992. In 1994, Borders merged with the Kmart chain Waldenbooks to form Borders-Walden Group, which was sold in 1995. In February 2011, Borders filed for Chapter 11 bankruptcy and announced plans to liquidate in July after failing to find a buyer to keep the chain's remaining 399 stores in operation. The remaining stores closed in September.
 Builders Square was a home improvement superstore. In 1997, it was sold to Hechinger, which went out of business in 1999.
 Designer Depot: A discount clothing store chain operated in Metro Detroit in the 1980s. The first opened in a former S. S. Kresge dime store in St. Clair Shores, Michigan in 1982, selling brand names such as Yves Saint Laurent, Izod Lacoste, and Calvin Klein at discount prices.
 K-Café was an in-store restaurant that served a fairly standard menu of hamburgers, hot dogs, French fries, grilled cheese sandwiches and Philly cheesesteak. They also offered a full breakfast menu of baked goods, bagels and egg platters with bacon or sausage and such snacks as nachos, pretzels, popcorn and ice cream. In addition to the café's menu, hot food items could also be purchased at the deli and eaten in the Deli Café at Super Kmart Center stores. However, K-Café has been discontinued in all of their stores. Most restaurants that were located at Super Kmart Center stores were instead known as Super K-Café. However, some Kmart stores have Nathan's Famous Hot Dog Eateries and Little Caesars Pizza Stations instead of K-Cafés.
 KDollar was a chain of discount stores/dollar stores that sold Kmart merchandise at a discount. The stores were often former Kmart or Big Kmart stores. Sears Brands filed for a trademark on the KDollar name on November 6, 2012. The first opened in a former regular Kmart store in Bloomfield Hills, Michigan in 2013. A second KDollar store opened in Waukegan, Illinois.
 Kmart Chef restaurants were a small chain of free-standing fast-food restaurants owned by Kmart, started in 1967 with the first location on the parking lot of a Kmart in Pontiac, Michigan. The "limited, high-turnover menu" (as Kmart founder S.S. Kresge put it) consisted of hamburgers, French fries, hot dogs, and soft drinks. The Kmart Chef chain folded in 1974 after peaking at 11 locations.
 Kmart Dental was an in-store dental office located in Kmart stores. There was only one such prototype in a Kmart store, in Miami, Florida. Despite the name, Kmart Dental was never technically owned by Kmart.
 Kmart Express was a chain of gas stations/convenience stores located in out-parcels at some Kmart and Super Kmart stores, particularly in the Midwest. In the early 2000s, there were plans to expand this concept to most Kmarts, but the plan for more locations was canceled after Kmart's bankruptcy in 2002. The final Kmart Express, in Ionia, MI, closed in 2017.
 Kmart Food Stores was a supermarket chain founded in 1962. Most Kmart Food locations were paired with Kmart stores, often operated by a local grocery chain but always branded as Kmart Food. The chain was discontinued in the early 1980s.
 Kwash was an attached-to-store laundromat launched in May 2010. Only one such prototype existed. It was in a former auto bay in Iowa City, Iowa. It featured a separate entrance, laundromat attendants and free wi-fi along with a limited selection of laundry goods available for purchase. The Kwash closed along with the Kmart in 2017.
 Makro, a Dutch warehouse club chain, operated locations in the U.S. from February 1981 to 1989, in Atlanta, Philadelphia, and the Washington, D.C. suburb of Largo, Maryland. Kmart bought the chain's entire American holdings in 1989, having owned a 49 percent share before. The Makro stores were later converted to Pace or closed in 1990.
 Office Square was a chain selling office supplies and office furniture which was a spin-off of Builders Square. In 1991, OfficeMax was acquired by Kmart and Office Square was merged into OfficeMax stores.
 OfficeMax is a chain selling office supplies and office furniture which was acquired in 1991 and sold in 1995. It was acquired by Office Depot in 2013.
 Pace Membership Warehouse was Kmart's warehouse club brand, until the chain was purchased by Walmart. In 1993, Walmart converted most of the stores into its Sam's Club brand, and sold others to chains such as Bradlees.
 PayLess Drugs was a chain of drug stores acquired by Kmart in 1985 and later sold to TCH Corporation in 1994. The resulting entity, Thrifty PayLess, was acquired by Rite Aid in 1996, which converted all of the PayLess and Thrifty stores into Rite Aid stores in 1999. The PayLess division also owned Bi-Mart, which was spun off along with sister stores such as Pay 'n Save.
 The Sports Authority was a chain of sporting goods stores which was acquired in 1990 and sold in 1995. The Sports Authority went out of business in 2016.
 Super Kmart Center was a chain of superstores that carried everything a regular Kmart carries, but also had a full grocery section with meat and poultry, baked goods, a delicatessen, garden produce, and fresh seafood. The first store opened in Medina, Ohio on July 25, 1991, which downsized to a regular Kmart before closing for good in 2012. In 1997 a few days after Kmart opened its first Big Kmart store in Chicago, the Super Kmart Center brand was renamed to Super Kmart. Super Kmart Center stores also featured a garden center, a video rental store, a branch of a local bank, an arcade, a portrait studio, a Jackson Hewitt tax center, a pharmacy, and usually a deli café or Little Caesars Pizza Station. Many of these services were closed and discontinued in recent years. Several locations also included Kmart Express gas stations, and most had an auto center. Most Super Kmarts were closed during the two rounds of closures in 2002 and 2003, and many had their groceries removed, converting them into regular Kmart locations. A typical Super Center sold around $30 million of merchandise during one fiscal year. In 2015, some stores were converted into a regular Kmart with a concept called K-Fresh. These stores feature an expanded pantry and a fresh-food department, though these types of items are no longer prepared on-site and are now prepackaged. The deli, butcher and bakery operations were also closed. Kmart gradually closed its Super Kmart stores; the last location was in Warren, Ohio and closed on April 8, 2018. It was replaced by Meijer.
 U-Pak was a single "no-frills" supermarket which sold items out of boxes instead of on shelves, and featured reduced hours. It opened adjacent to a Kmart on Opdyke Boulevard in Pontiac, Michigan in 1979 and closed less than a month later due to poor sales.
 Variety Outlet. A closeout chain, typically operated out of closed Kmart stores. The first opened in Rome, Georgia in 1994.
 Waldenbooks was a chain consisting primarily of shopping-mall–based book stores which was acquired in 1984. In 1994, Kmart chain Borders merged with Waldenbooks to form Borders-Walden Group, which was sold in 1995 (the company was subsequently renamed Borders Group, and went out of business in 2011).

Philanthropy 

Kmart for Kids was the umbrella program for Kmart's philanthropic initiatives. The program had helped children across the country live happier, healthier lives through the support of: March of Dimes, St. Jude Children's Research Hospital, and American Diabetes Association.
At one time, Kmart was March of Dimes' number one corporate sponsor, having raised $114 million for the charity over more than 30 years.

On July 29, 2008, Don Germano, SVP/GM of Kmart stores, was elected to a five-year term on the national Board of Trustees of the March of Dimes Foundation.

Kmart for Kids had supported St. Jude's Children's Research Hospital through its annual Thanks and Giving campaign, an opportunity for Kmart customers to give thanks for the healthy children in their lives and give to help those who are not. A record $21.9 million (equivalent to $ in ) was donated for the tenth annual fundraising campaign during the 2013 holiday season.

In 2008, Kmart earned the "Outstanding Corporate Citizen" Award for its support of the American Diabetes Association's "Step Out: Walk to Fight Diabetes" program. The tribute honored Kmart for the most well-developed, proactive program in the areas of charity, community development, diversity, philanthropy, and associate development. In 2008, Kmart became a national sponsor of "Step Out: Walk to Fight Diabetes" and over the past two years, Kmart's customers and associates have raised approximately $1.5 million (equivalent to $ in ) through its in-store campaigns.

Environmental record 
On May 9, 2007, Kmart was penalized $102,422 (equivalent to $ in ) for violations of federal hazardous waste, clean water, emergency planning and preparation regulations at 17 distribution centers. Kmart corrected the violations by preparing and implementing spill-prevention control and countermeasure plans, applying for appropriate storm-water permits, complying with hazardous-waste-generator requirements, and submitting reports to state and local emergency-planning and response organizations informing them of the presence of hazardous substances. The Environmental Protection Agency also accused Kmart of not maintaining adequate information and failing to act in accordance with hazardous-waste-storage and disposal requirements. For instance, the EPA reported having discovered improperly labeled oil-storage drums at a location in Falls, Pennsylvania.

Kmart promoted battery recycling. In 1990, Kmart proposed spending about $80 million (equivalent to $ in ) on full-page newspaper advertisements offering to recycle junk batteries for $2 (equivalent to $ in ) each.

Animal welfare concerns 
In 2012, Mercy for Animals, a non-profit organization working against cruelty to farmed animals, conducted an infiltration at Christensen Farms, a pork supplier to Kmart, Walmart and Costco, obtaining hidden-camera footage of pigs confined in small gestation crates and cruelty to piglets. In response to Mercy for Animals' infiltration, Kmart announced it would begin requiring its pork suppliers to phase out gestation crates.

Racing sponsorships 
Kmart was a prominent sponsor in NASCAR and the now-defunct CART series. They were a longtime sponsor of Newman/Haas Racing, owned by actor Paul Newman and former racer Carl Haas. Their CART drivers included Nigel Mansell and the father-son duo of Michael and Mario Andretti. Michael Andretti and Mansell won championships under Kmart sponsorship in 1991 and 1993, respectively. When Michael Andretti moved to Formula One in 1993, Kmart sponsored his McLaren for the season. The store also sponsored the NASCAR-sanctioned Kmart 400 at Michigan and North Carolina Speedway. Lake Speed garnered Kmart's first win in NASCAR in 1988 at the Darlington Raceway. Kmart sponsored three-time champion Darrell Waltrip in 1999 and 2000, his last two full-time seasons. Most recently, in NASCAR, the store sponsored Boris Said's #60 No Fear Ford Fusion in 2006.

International

Australia and New Zealand 

The first Kmart store in Australia opened in 1969 in Burwood East, Victoria; the site was renovated in 2010 to be a shopping mall known as Burwood One.

Kmart Australia was born out of a joint venture between G.J. Coles & Coy Limited (Coles) and the S.S. Kresge Company (Kresge), with Kresge owning 51% of the common stock in the company and the remaining 49% being owned by Coles. The first New Zealand store opened in Henderson a suburb of Auckland in 1988. Kresge later exited this partnership in 1994 selling their ownership in the company to Coles Myer the successor to G. J. Coles & Coy Limited. Since the dissolution of Coles Myer in 2007, the Australian and New Zealand Kmart stores are owned by Wesfarmers.

Canada 

Kmart closed five Montreal stores and several other Quebec stores in 1983 due to the company restructuring. Kresge ceased to exist in Canada in 1994. In December 1997, it was announced that ten of the existing 122 stores were to be closed. However, as a result of Kmart's ongoing financial difficulties, the Canadian division comprising 112 stores was sold to competitor Zellers of the Hudson's Bay Company in May 1998, after which the stores were either closed or converted to Hudson's Bay Company brands, mostly Zellers.

Slogans 
 The Saving Place 1960s–1990
 Your Lowest Price is a Kmart Price 1990–1998

Caribbean 
In the early 2000s, Kmart tried to expand into Caribbean countries where Wal-Mart and Target had no presence, but ultimately none of the proposed stores advanced beyond the construction stage and none opened by the time Kmart filed for bankruptcy in 2002 when it stopped paying its construction contractors.

Kmart started construction of a Super Kmart in 2001 in Trinidad, but halted it in 2002 when the store was 80 percent complete. There were plans for more stores to be built in Trinidad, as well as in Millennium Heights in Barbados, five stores in the Dominican Republic, and a potential foray into Jamaica. The unfinished Super Kmart store in Trinidad and Tobago is now a Tru Value Supermarket.

Europe 

In 1992, Kmart purchased several communist-era department stores in Eastern Europe, including 13 in the former Czechoslovakia that were bought from the former Czechoslovak government. One of those stores was the old MÁJ department store on Národní Třída in Prague. Many of these outlets were quite profitable, with the Bratislava location setting a single-store sales record for the company. In March 1996, due to its troubles in the U.S., the Kmart Corporation announced that it had agreed to sell the six Kmart stores in the Czech Republic and the seven in Slovakia to Tesco of Britain for about $117.5 million (equivalent to $ in ), to focus on its core operations in North America.

Mexico 

In the 1990s, Kmart opened four stores in Mexico, in partnership with the Mexican retailer Liverpool. All were supercenters located in suburbs of Mexico City. About half of the store area was devoted to groceries, and this part of the stores resembled those in the US with some adjustments to the local market. These plus an unfinished store were sold in 1997 to the Mexican hypermarket chain Mega (part of Comercial Mexicana) and remain open under that name, except the store in Tlalnepantla, which was demolished in 2004 to build a Costco.

Singapore 
In 1994, Kmart opened a 9,700-square-metre (104,000 sq ft) store in the Marina Square Shopping Center in a joint venture with Metro (Private) Limited. The joint venture with Singapore was dissolved in 1996. The Marina Square location became MegaMart, then as NTUC FairPrice and Giant.

Management 
 S. S. Kresge, Founder (founder; 1899–1925, president; 1925–1966, CEO)
 Charles Belden Van Dusen (1925–1938, president)
 Robert R. Williams (1938–1946, president)
 D. C. Fisher (1946–1953, president)
 Franklin P. Williams (1953–1958, president)
 Harry Blair Cunningham (1959–1972, president and general manager; 1966–1972, CEO)
 Robert E. Dewar (1970, president; 1972–1980, CEO)
 Ervin Wardlow (1972, president)
 Bernard Fauber (1980–1987, chairman, CEO)
 Joseph E. Antonini (1987 – May 1995, CEO)
 Floyd Hall (June 1995 – April 2000, president, chairman; June 1995-March 2002 CEO)
 Charles Conaway (2000–2002, chairman, CEO)
 Mark Schwartz (-January 2003, president, COO)
 James B. Adamson (2002 – January 2003, president, chairman, CEO)
 Julian Day (March 2002, president, COO; January 2003 – September 2004, president, COO, CEO)
 Aylwin Lewis (October 2004 – December 2007, president, CEO)
 W. Bruce Johnson (January 2008 – February 2011)
 Herman Darling (March 2011 – December 2012)
 Eddie S. Lampert (January 2013 – October 2018, still on board after filing for bankruptcy)

See also 

 Kmart Australia
 Sears Holdings
 Transformco

References 
Notes

Bibliography
 

Further reading
 Archived at Ghostarchive and the Wayback Machine:

External links 

 

 
1899 establishments in Michigan
Companies based in Cook County, Illinois
Hoffman Estates, Illinois
Companies based in Detroit
Companies based in Troy, Michigan
Companies that filed for Chapter 11 bankruptcy in 2002
Companies that filed for Chapter 11 bankruptcy in 2018
Defunct retail companies of Canada
Discount stores of the United States
Retail companies established in 1899
Sears Holdings
Superstores in the United States
Toy retailers of the United States
2005 mergers and acquisitions
American companies established in 1899